Coffee is an unincorporated community in Bacon County, Georgia, United States.

History
A post office called Coffee was established in 1890, and remained in operation until 1957. The community was either named after a local pioneer citizen or after General John E. Coffee, a state legislator and a U. S. representative (sources vary).

References

Unincorporated communities in Bacon County, Georgia
Unincorporated communities in Georgia (U.S. state)